Irina Maharani (born 25 December 1961) is a Malaysian sport shooter. She tied for 32nd place in the women's 10 metre air pistol event and placed 36th in the women's 25 metre pistol event at the 2000 Summer Olympics.

References

1961 births
Living people
Malaysian female sport shooters
Olympic shooters of Malaysia
Shooters at the 2000 Summer Olympics
Commonwealth Games medallists in shooting
Commonwealth Games silver medallists for Malaysia
Shooters at the 2002 Commonwealth Games
20th-century Malaysian women
21st-century Malaysian women
Medallists at the 2002 Commonwealth Games